Fotogramas de Plata are a series of Spanish annual film, theatre and television awards awarded by Fotogramas film magazine since 1951.

On 5 February 1951, Fotogramas magazine awarded their first Placa de San Juan Bosco award to actor Jesús Tordesillas for his performance in 1950 film Pequeñeces. New categories were added over time to the award, they were renamed to Fotogramas de Plata and in 2012 they absorbed the TP de Oro awards.

References

Spanish film awards
Spanish theatre awards
Spanish television awards
Awards established in 1951